Deodeok-gui is a Korean vegetable dish thinly spread out and broiled with gochujang.

Origin and Its efficacy
The dish was invented by ethnic Koreans living in China.

Deodeok roots are rich in minerals and vitamins, including fiber, calcium, phosphorus, and iron. The white essence that comes out when it is cut, is a saponin, and it is a bitter substances, but it improves lung. It has long been used as a medicine to treat bronchitis and asthma. Along with inulin, Saponins reduce cholesterol in the blood and lipid content, and lower blood pressure.

See also
 Deodeok
 Gui
Korean barbecue
barbecue

References

Korean cuisine
Barbecue